Dykyi or Dikiy is a surname meaning "wild" in Ukrainian and Russian. Less common transliterations include Dykyy, Dykyj, Dikii, and Dikij.

Notable people with the surname include:
 Aleksei Dikiy (1889–1955), Soviet actor
 Andrey Dikiy (1893–1977), Russian writer
  (1900–1937), Ukrainian writer
  (born 1969), Ukrainian politician
 Volodymyr Dykyi (1962–2021), Ukrainian footballer and coach

See also
 
 

Ukrainian-language surnames
Russian-language surnames